Charicrita is a genus of moths of the family Yponomeutidae.

Species
Charicrita citrozona - Meyrick, 1913 
Charicrita othonina - Turner, 1926 
Charicrita sericoleuca - Turner, 1923 

Yponomeutidae